The 2022–23 Utah Valley Wolverines women's basketball team represents Utah Valley University in the 2022–23 NCAA Division I women's basketball season. Dan Nielson entered the season as head coach for his 4th season. The Wolverines played their home games at the UCCU Center and Lockhart Arena in Orem, Utah as members of the Western Athletic Conference (WAC).

Previous season 

The Wolverines finished the 2021–22 season 16–15, 10–8 in WAC play to finish in fourth place. In the 2022 WAC women's basketball tournament, they defeated Texas-Rio Grande Valley in the quarterfinals before losing to Stephen F. Austin in the semifinals.

Offseason

Departures

Incoming transfers

Roster

Schedule and results 

|-
!colspan=12 style=| Exhibition

|-
!colspan=12 style=| Non-conference season

|-
!colspan=12 style=| WAC conference season

|-
!colspan=9 style=|WAC Tournament

See also 

 2022–23 Utah Valley Wolverines men's basketball team

References 

Utah Valley
Utah Valley Wolverines women's basketball seasons
2022 in sports in Utah
2023 in sports in Utah